Foutz is a surname. Notable people with the surname include:

Dave Foutz (1856–1897), American baseball player
Frank Foutz (1877–1961), American baseball player, brother of Dave

See also
Foltz
Fouts